Two Happy People is a 1943 comedy film directed by E. W. Emo and starring Magda Schneider, Wolf Albach-Retty, and Oskar Sima. The film was made by Wien-Film, a Vienna-based company set up after Austria had been incorporated into Greater Germany following the 1938 Anschluss.

The film's sets were designed by the art directors Erich Grave and Franz Berger.

Premise
Two divorce lawyers' intense commitment to their work almost leads to the breakdown of their own marriage.

Cast

References

Bibliography

External links 
 

1943 films
Films of Nazi Germany
German romantic comedy films
1943 romantic comedy films
1940s German-language films
Films directed by E. W. Emo
Films about divorce
German black-and-white films
1940s German films